Hydriomena furculoides is a species of moth in the family Geometridae first described by William Barnes and James Halliday McDunnough in 1917. It is found in North America.

The MONA or Hodges number for Hydriomena furculoides is 7273.

References

Further reading

 
 

Hydriomena
Articles created by Qbugbot
Moths described in 1917